Time in the Gambia is given by a single time zone, denoted as Greenwich Mean Time (GMT; UTC±00:00). Adopted in 1918,<ref>Howse, Derek (1997) "Greenwich Time and the Longitude: Official Millennium Edition". National Maritime Museum. Bloomsbury USA. p. 148. Retrieved 5 September 2021.</ref> the Gambia has never observed daylight saving time (DST).

 IANA time zone database 
In the IANA time zone database, the Gambia is given one zone in the file zone.tab – Africa/Banjul. "GM" refers to the country's ISO 3166-1 alpha-2 country code. Data for the Gambia directly from zone.tab of the IANA time zone database; columns marked with * are the columns from zone.tab itself:

 See also 
List of time zones by country
List of UTC time offsets

 References 

 External links 
Current time in the Gambia at Time.isTime in the Gambia at TimeAndDate.com''

Time in the Gambia